The Frigid Sea is a 1954 Soviet drama film directed by Yuri Yegorov.

Plot 
Several Pomor fishermen were attacked by sea pirates and were forced to spend more than one year on a desert island. Many considered them dead   but almost all of them managed to survive.

Historical background 
Prototypes of the film's heroes were four Russian hunters from Mezen, led by forage Aleksey Khimkov, who spent more than 6 years on the uninhabited island of Edgeøya in the southeastern part of the Spitsbergen archipelago, which in the Russian North was called Little Brun. Based on their stories, the French scientist Pierre Louis Leroy, who lived and worked in Russia, published in 1760 an essay.

Cast
 Nikolay Kryuchkov as  Aleksey Khimkov
 Valentin Grachyov as Vanya Khimkov, his son (as Valya Grachyov)
 Gennadi Yudin as Crewman Stepan Shaparov
 Elza Lezhdey as Varvara
 Mark Bernes as Okladnikov
 Aleksandr Pelevin as Vernizobar  
 Georgi Chernovolenko as Capt. Van Glek
 Aleksandra Danilova as Nastya Khinkova
 Anatoly Kubatsky as Grandfather Nikifor
 Aleksandr Antonov as Amos Kornilov
 Igor Bezyayev
 Valentina Telegina as Terentyevna
 Nikolay Gorlov
 Yakov Khaletskiy
 Elena Kondrateva as Mat Varvary
 Mikhail Kuznetsov as Crewman Fedor Verigin

References

External links 
 

1954 films
1950s historical drama films
1950s Russian-language films
Soviet historical drama films
Gorky Film Studio films
Films set in the 18th century
Films set on uninhabited islands
Edgeøya
1954 drama films